The New Zealand women's national cricket team toured Ireland and England in July and August 2004. They first played Ireland in 3 One Day Internationals, winning the series 3–0. They then played England in the first ever Twenty20 International for either gender, with New Zealand winning the match by 9 runs. Finally, they played England in 5 ODIs and 1 Test match, with England winning the ODI series 3–2 and the Test match ending as a draw.

Tour of Ireland

Squads

WODI Series

1st ODI

2nd ODI

3rd ODI

Tour of England

Squads

Tour Matches

20-over match: Sussex v New Zealand

50-over match: Marylebone Cricket Club v New Zealand

50-over match: England Development Squad v New Zealand

50-over match: England Development Squad v New Zealand

Only T20I

WODI Series

1st ODI

2nd ODI

3rd ODI

4th ODI

5th ODI

Only Test

References

External links
New Zealand Women tour of Ireland 2004 from Cricinfo
New Zealand Women tour of England 2004 from Cricinfo

International cricket competitions in 2004
2004 in women's cricket
Women's cricket tours of England
Women's international cricket tours of Ireland
New Zealand women's national cricket team tours